Diane of the Follies is a 1916 American drama film directed by  Christy Cabanne. The film is considered to be lost.

Cast
 Lillian Gish in the role of Diane
 Sam De Grasse in the role of Phillips Christy
 Howard Gaye in the role of Don Livingston
 Lillian Langdon in the role of Marcia Christy
Allan Sears in the role of Jimmie Darcy (as A.D. Sears)
 Wilbur Higby in the role of Theatrical Manager
 William De Vaull in the role of Butler
 Wilhelmina Siegmann in the role of Bijou Christy
 Adele Clifton in the role of Follies Girl
 Clara Morris in the role of Follies Girl
 Helen Wolcott in the role of Follies Girl
 Grace Heins in the role of Follies Girl

See also
 Lillian Gish filmography

References

External links

1916 films
1916 comedy-drama films
1910s dance films
1916 lost films
1910s English-language films
American silent feature films
American black-and-white films
Films directed by Christy Cabanne
Lost American films
Lost comedy-drama films
Triangle Film Corporation films
1910s American films
Silent American comedy-drama films